Norberg is a town in Sweden

Norberg may also refer to:

People
 Anette Norberg (born 1966), Swedish curler and Olympic gold medalist
 Arthur Norberg (born 1938), American historian
 Cathrine Lindahl née Norberg (born 1970), Swedish curler and younger sister of above
 Charlotta Norberg (1824–1892), Swedish ballerina
 Dea Norberg (born 1974), Swedish singer
 Frank Norberg (born 1948), Irish hurler
 Hank Norberg (1920–1974), American football player
 Helena Norberg-Hodge, Swedish environmentalist
 Johan Norberg (born 1973), Swedish historian of ideas
 Jonas Norberg, inventor of The Pacemaker
 Kent Norberg (born 1967), Swedish ice hockey player
 Lennart Norberg (born 1949), Swedish ice hockey player
 Märta Norberg (born 1922), Swedish cross-country skier
 Mikael Norberg (born 1966), Swedish curler
 Nils Norberg, Swedish heavy metal guitarist
 Richard Norberg, American professor of physics

Swedish-language surnames